The 1928 National Championship (Serbo-Croato-Slovenian: Državno prvenstvo 1928. / Државно првенство 1928.) proclaimed Gradanski Zagreb once again as the reigning champions, with Hajduk and BSK following closely behind.

Qualifications
The champions of the Belgrade, Split and Zagreb subassociations qualified directly to the final phase, while the second place teams of Belgrade and Zagreb, along with the champions of the rest of the subassociations, played a two-legged elimination round.

The representatives were:

Subassociation of Belgrade: SK Jugoslavija (qualified directly) and BSK Belgrade
Subassociation of Zagreb: Građanski Zagreb (qualified directly) and HAŠK
Subassociation of Split: Hajduk Split (qualified directly)
Subassociation of Ljubljana: Primorje
Subassociation of Osijek: Građanski Osijek
Subassociation of Sarajevo: SAŠK
Subassociation of Subotica: SAND Subotica

Qualifying round:
BSK – Građanski Osijek 6:1, 6:1
HAŠK – SAND 6:1, 4:2
Primorje – SAŠK 4:3, 2:3, extra match: 2:3

The qualifiers were played in both, home and away matches, and were played on June 10 the first leg, and on June 17 the second.  Primorje and SAŠK needed an extra match which was played on June 18 in Sarajevo.

League

Results

Winning squad
Champions:

HŠK GRAĐANSKI
Maksimilijan Mihalčić
Zvonimir Gmajnički
Franz Mantler
Rudolf Hitrec
Pikić
Viktor Mihaljević
Miho Remec
Nikola Babić
Dragutin Babić
Emil Perška
Slavin Cindrić
Franjo Giler

Top scorers
Final goalscoring position, number of goals, player/players and club.
1 - 8 goals - Ljubo Benčić (Hajduk Split)
2 - 5 goals - Branko Zinaja (HAŠK)
3 - 3 goals - Dragutin Babić, Slavin Cindrić (both Građanski Zagreb), Kuzman Sotirović, Milorad Dragičević (both BSK Belgrade)

See also
Yugoslav Cup
Yugoslav League Championship
Football Association of Yugoslavia

References

External links
Yugoslavia Domestic Football Full Tables

1
Yugoslav Football Championship